Agioi Anargyroi is a village in the municipal unit of Tsotyli, Kozani regional unit, Greece. 

Populated places in Kozani (regional unit)